Johan Hendrik van Dale (15 February 1828 - 19 May 1872) was a Dutch teacher, archivist, and lexicographer. He created Van Dale's Great Dictionary of the Dutch Language; first published in 1874, after his death. It was, and in its subsequent editions remains, the leading dictionary of the Dutch language.

Biography
Van Dale's parents were from Eeklo, in the Flemish province of East Flanders, Belgium. There was a smallpox epidemic in Meetjesland, in East Flanders: Abram (Abraham) van Dale (1799-1837) and his pregnant wife Pietje (Pieternella Johanna du Bois, 1802-1865) fled from it to Sluis, in the Netherlands; where their son, Johan Hendrik, was born.

Johan Hendrik must have been an excellent student and scholar. At the age of 16, he was awarded an official teaching certificate (onderwijsbevoegdheid), fourth class. Four years later, he was promoted to the second class. In 1854, he was appointed headmaster of the public school in Sluis. In 1857, he was appointed honorary city archivist. He wrote textbooks about the importance of clarity in language, and articles about the history of Sluis.

In 1866, he published his first lexigraphical work: Taalkundig handboekje, of alphabetische lijst van alle Nederlandsche woorden, die wegens spelling of taalkundig gebruik aan eenige bedenking onderhevig zijn ("Linguistic handbook, or alphabetical list of all Dutch words which, on account of their spelling or linguistic use, may be open to objection"). He accepted the task, and completed it within four years. He wrote in the preface to the first edition, of 1872: 

The dictionary was in its final stages of completion - the first volume had already been published - when, in 1872, van Dale caught smallpox, and died of it. His pupil (kwekeling (nl))  saw the rest of it through to publication.

The first edition of the Groot woordenboek received some criticism for not upholding academic standards of correctness; but was also widely praised. From its fourth edition on, and in its later revisions, van Dale's name has been attached to the Groot woordenboek as a sign of its authority in all matters concerning the Dutch language.

References

1828 births
1872 deaths
People from Sluis
Dutch lexicographers
19th-century lexicographers